Scottish legislation refers to primary and secondary legislation applicable to Scotland, passed by the pre-Union Scottish parliament, the Parliament of Great Britain, the Parliament of the United Kingdom or the devolved Scottish Parliament. See:

 List of Acts of the Parliament of Scotland to 1707 
 List of Acts of the Scottish Parliament from 1999
 Scottish Statutory Instrument

See also
 List of European Union directives